This is a list of singles that charted in the top ten of the ARIA Charts in 2015. In 2015 fifty-three acts, reached the top ten for the first time.

Top-ten singles

Key

2014 peaks

2016 peaks

Entries by artist
The following table shows artists who achieved two or more top 10 entries in 2015, including songs that reached their peak in 2014 and 2016. The figures include both main artists and featured artists. The total number of weeks an artist spent in the top ten in 2015 is also shown.

See also
2015 in music
ARIA Charts
List of number-one singles of 2015 (Australia)
List of top 25 singles for 2015 in Australia

References 

2015 in Australian music
Australia Top 10
Top 10 singles 2015
Australia 2015